Alec Thomas Brown (born July 23, 1992) is an American professional basketball player for BC Budivelnyk of the European North Basketball League and the Champions League. He played college basketball at the University of Wisconsin–Green Bay. Brown was drafted 50th overall in the 2014 NBA draft by the Phoenix Suns, though he never appeared in a game with the team. Brown subsequently played for the NBA G League franchises of the Suns and Chicago Bulls before playing in Europe.

High school career
Brown attended Winona Senior High School in Winona, Minnesota. As a junior, he averaged 14.2 points and 7.0 rebounds per game. In his senior year, he averaged 22.4 points, 9.8 rebounds and 4.9 blocks per game. He led his school to a record of 29–2 and finished third in the class AAA State Tournament. On January 8, 2010, Brown recorded a triple-double with 22 points, 12 rebounds and 12 blocks against Mankato West High School. He was named "Winona Daily News Player of the Year", was also named to the AP all-state 1st team, the class AAA all-tournament team at the State Tournament, and to the 1st team all-Big 9 Conference. During his high school career he set seven Winona records, such as points in a game (44), points in a season (650), blocks in a game (13), blocks in a season (141), field goals in a game (18), field goals scored in one season (247), and free throws scored in one season (152).
Considered a three-star recruit by Rivals.com, Brown was listed as the No. 31 center in the nation in 2010.

College career
Standing 7 feet 1 inch tall, Brown became the first seven-footer to sign with Green Bay. He started for the Phoenix as a freshman and set the school single game mark for blocked shots. Over his four-year career, Brown was twice named first team All-Horizon League (in 2012 and 2014) and as a senior was named conference Defensive Player of the Year.

Brown graduated and left Green Bay as the school's career leader in blocked shots (309 – also tied for the modern-day Horizon League record) and scored 1,678 points and collected 800 rebounds.

Professional career

Bakersfield Jam (2015)
Following the completion of his college career, Brown trained to prepare for 2014 NBA draft workouts. He gained attention at the NBA Draft Combine in Chicago, measuring a full seven feet tall without shoes and enjoying one of the top shooting performances of any player, including hitting 18 of 25 NBA-range three-pointers in standing shooting drills. On June 26, 2014, he was selected with the 50th overall pick in the 2014 NBA draft by the Phoenix Suns. In July 2014, he joined the Suns for the 2014 NBA Summer League. During the Suns' final Summer League game, Brown injured his left shoulder during the first quarter of the team's blowout loss to the Dallas Mavericks. After undergoing surgery on July 24, he was ruled out for at least 3–4 months. He signed a contract with the Suns on September 14, 2014, but was waived by the team three days later. Brown had initially planned to play for Obradoiro CAB in the Liga ACB once his shoulder was fully healed. However, after taking extra time off to rehabilitate the same shoulder that gave him problems during his senior year at Green Bay, Brown eventually filed paper work with the NBA G League and entered the league's player pool. On February 16, 2015, he was acquired by the Bakersfield Jam, the Suns' G-League affiliate. The next day, he made his debut for the Jam, recording six points and five blocks in the 120–109 win over the Los Angeles D-Fenders. During his time with the Jam, he averaged 7.0 points, 3.5 rebounds and 2.0 blocks in 20 games.

Río Natura Monbús Obradoiro (2015–2016)
In July 2015, Brown re-joined the Phoenix Suns for the 2015 Las Vegas Summer League. On July 31, he signed with Obradoiro CAB of Spain for the 2015–16 season. In 29 games for Obradoiro, he averaged 6.1 points and 2.9 rebounds per game.

Windy City Bulls (2016–2017)
In July 2016, Brown again joined Suns for the 2016 Las Vegas Summer League. In September, 2016, the Suns renounced to his draft rights and on October 29, the Suns' D-League affiliate, the Northern Arizona Suns, traded his player rights to the Windy City Bulls. He subsequently joined Windy City's training camp roster, and went on to make the opening night roster. He made his debut for the Bulls on November 11, 2016, recording 17 points, six rebounds and three blocks in a 123–94 win over the Long Island Nets.

Movistar Estudiantes (2017–2018)
On April 6, 2017, he signed with Spanish club Movistar Estudiantes for the rest of the 2016–17 ACB season.

In July 2017, Brown played in the NBA Summer League for the Los Angeles Lakers.

Breogán (2018–2019)
On July 31, 2018, Brown signed with Breogán.

Nizhny Novgorod (2019)
On July 25, 2019, Brown signed with BC Nizhny Novgorod of the VTB United League.

Telekom Baskets Bonn (2019–2020)
On December 27, 2019, Brown signed with Telekom Baskets Bonn of the Basketball Bundesliga.

Second stint with Estudiantes (2020–2021)
On July 1, 2020, Brown returned to Spain, signing with Estudiantes in Liga Endesa. He averaged 8.1 points, 3.9 rebounds, and 1.2 blocks per game.

BC Budivelnyk (2021–2022)
On August 21, 2021, Brown signed with BC Budivelnyk of the Ukrainian Basketball SuperLeague.

Yalovaspor (2022)
On March 8, 2022, he has signed with Semt77 Yalovaspor of the Turkish Basketball Super League.

Return to Budivelnyk (2022–present)
On August 7, 2022, he has signed with BC Budivelnyk of the European North Basketball League.

National team
Brown played with the senior United States national team at the 2017 FIBA AmeriCup, where he won a gold medal.

Career statistics
Spanish ACB League

NBA D-League

References

External links
FIBA.com profile
Green Bay Phoenix bio

1992 births
Living people
American expatriate basketball people in Spain
American expatriate basketball people in Ukraine
American men's basketball players
Bakersfield Jam players
Basketball players from Minnesota
BC Budivelnyk players
BC Nizhny Novgorod players
CB Estudiantes players
Centers (basketball)
Green Bay Phoenix men's basketball players
Liga ACB players
Obradoiro CAB players
People from Winona, Minnesota
Phoenix Suns draft picks
Power forwards (basketball)
Telekom Baskets Bonn players
United States men's national basketball team players
Windy City Bulls players
Yalovaspor BK players